Chenu may refer to:

People 
 Augustin Chenu (1833–1875), French painter
 Jean-Charles Chenu (1808–1879), French physician, naturalist and author
 Marie-Dominique Chenu (1895–1990), French Catholic theologian
 Peter Francis Chenu (1760–1834), British sculptor of French birth
 Sébastien Chenu (born 1973), French politician

Places 
 Chenu, Sarthe, France
 Chenu, Iran